Dallastown Area High School is a large suburban, American High School, part of the Dallastown Area School District. The school is located at 700 New School Lane, Dallastown, Pennsylvania in York County, Pennsylvania. Dallastown Area High School is commonly referred to as Dallastown, Dallastown High, DAHS, and DHS. According to the National Center for Education Statistics, in the 2018–2019 school year, Dallastown Area High School reported an enrollment of 1,927 pupils in grades nine through twelve.

History
The first Dallastown High School class graduated in 1898. The first constructed building to house the newly created Dallastown High School, a combination of local schoolhouses, was on Charles St. in Dallastown, now Dallastown Elementary. This building became too small, and effective July 1, 1958; the school districts of Loganville, Springfield and York Township became the York Imperial Union School District. Accordingly, the Dallastown Area School System, which operated all of the schools in the area, grades 1 through 12, was composed of three member districts: Dallastown Borough, Yoe Borough and York Imperial Union. Realizing an immediate need for a building for secondary school purposes, a site was selected and construction of a  building began. On September 1, 1958, the doors of the new Dallastown Area High School opened. The Dallastown Area High School was first constructed in 1958 and underwent a major renovation and remodel in 2001. The current building contains the longest school hallway in Pennsylvania, at almost one third of a mile long.

Campus
The Dallastown High School is adjoined with Dallastown Area Middle School to form the Dallastown Middle-High School Campus. Due to growing overcrowding, the district administration determined building a new school to host grades four to six, the Dallastown Area Intermediate School, would help to alleviate this problem. The district removed the sixth grade from the Middle School in 2010, the year the Intermediate School was completed, allowing the High School to obtain some of the former Middle School classrooms. An enclosed hallway was built to connect the high school to the former middle school wing. In 2011, the high school became more energy efficient with solar panels on the roof of the campus; the panels were dedicated to long-time Dallastown Area School District board member Earl Miller.

Extracurricular activities
Dallastown's school newspaper, The Beacon, is published monthly; the yearbook, The Spectator, is produced annually. Each is student-run.

Athletics
The high school competes on a very high level in a variety of sports. Dallastown's athletic director is Tory Harvey. Their teams are part of PIAA triple or quad A, District 3, and YAIAA Division I.

Boys
Baseball - AAAA
Basketball- AAAA
Bowling - YAIAA
Cross country - AAA
Football - AAAAAA
Golf - AAA
Indoor track and field - AAAA
Lacrosse - AAAA
Soccer - AAA
Swimming and diving - AAA
Tennis - AAA
Track and field - AAA
Volleyball - AAA
Wrestling - AAA

Girls
Basketball - AAAA
Cross country - AAA
Indoor track and field - AAAA
Field hockey - AAA
Lacrosse - AAAA
Soccer (fall) - AAA
Softball - AAAA
Swimming and diving - AAAA
Girls' tennis - AAA
Track and yield - AAA
Volleyball - AAA

The York Dispatch Cup
Awarded annually since 2006, the York Dispatch Cup recognizes the most successful athletic programs in the York-Adams League. Dallastown competes in the Large School Division. Dallastown has enjoyed unparalleled success.

Fall sports

Football

The YAIAA is created (1960-1980)

The Wildcats emerged with the creation of a York-Adams county athletic conference, the YAIAA, which awarded its first football championship in 1960. Dallastown won four YAIAA championships in this 20-year period (1969, 1971, 1976, and 1980).

The drought (1981-2006)

In the time after winning the 1980 YAIAA championship in the 1980–1981 school year, the Wildcats failed to earn another YAIAA title or post-season playoff appearance, once created by the PIAA in 1988. The success of the team was often moderate, but the low point of this period was certainly the two-year stretch of one-win seasons in 2005  and 2006.

New success (2007-present)
The 2007 campaign was a welcome change from the previous dry-spell. The Wildcats obtained a 6-4 regular season record. Additionally, after a gutsy overtime play against rival Red Lion Area Senior High School to win 22–21, the Wildcats obtained a post-season berth for the first time in school history. Dallastown faced William Penn Senior High School and was defeated 21–6. The Wildcats won the YAIAA Sportsmanship Award for their 2007 campaign.

The Wildcats also qualified for the PIAA District 3 football playoffs in 2008 and 2009, each ending in a first-round lose against Penn Manor High School and Central York High School, respectively.

In 2010, the Wildcats would reach new heights. After going an undefeated 10–0 in regular season play, including a remarkable comeback from a 0–22 deficit against rival Red Lion Area Senior High School to win 38–36, the Wildcats not only saw themselves in post-season play, but holding sole possession of a YAIAA title. Additionally, Dallastown sat atop the final regular season PIAA District 3 power rankings. From there, the Wildcats opened post-season play against Conestoga Valley High School with a victory, the first playoff win in school history, to set up a rematch with Red Lion Area Senior High School. With revenge and redemption on their minds, the visiting Red Lion lions defeated the Wildcats in an upset 14–6. The loss ended the Wildcats season with an 11-1 overall record.

Cross country
The Dallastown Girls Cross Country team has been dominant in recent years, with PIAA District 3 Girls AAA Championship titles in 2018 and in 2021. The 2021 team placed runner-up at the PIAA Girls AAA State Championship in Hershey, PA, with 149 points scored, bringing home the program's first state trophy. The Dallastown Boys Cross Country team won its sole PIAA District 3 Boys AAA title in 1988.

Field hockey
The Dallastown Field Hockey team is noted for its success. Since 1991, the Wildcats have won 14 Division 1 titles in 1993, 1996–2000, and 2003–2010. The team has had varying levels of success in the PIAA District 3 Field Hockey tournament. Starting many PIAA District 3 Field Hockey tournaments as the number 1 seed, the Wildcats have found little success to match their seeding, but the Wildcats have qualified for the PIAA Field Hockey tournament, including a 4-year streak from 1996 to 1999.

Boys' soccer
The Dallastown Boys' Soccer team has been dominant in the YAIAA in recent years, including three-straight Division 1 titles in 2009, 2010, and 2011 and YAIAA Tournament Championships in 2010 and 2011. In all, the Wildcats have won 10 Division 1 titles since 1991, and another YAIAA Tournament Championship in 2001. The Wildcats met great success in 2010 with a PIAA District 3 Championship, the first since the 1996 title.

Winter sports

Wrestling
Once a powerhouse, the Dallastown wrestling program has met more individual than team success in recent years, the most recent being Clay Gable's PIAA Championship at the 171 weight class in 2009. Since 1967, the Wildcats have garnered an impressive 30 YAIAA Division 1 titles. In addition, the Wildcat wrestlers have 10 YAIAA Sportsmanship Award-winning teams.

Spring sports

Girls' soccer
Much like their male counterparts, the Dallastown girls' soccer team has enjoyed much recent success. The Wildcats have four Division 1 titles, including three straight in 2009, 2010, and 2011. In each of these three years, the girls have gone on to win the YAIAA Tournament.

Baseball
Dallastown Baseball has enjoyed moderate success in its history, including 6 Division 1 titles since 1992. In 2011, the Wildcats were runners-up in the YAIAA Tournament.

Notable alumni
 Rick Ufford-Chase, Class of 1982, Presbyterian activist and moderator of 216th General Assembly of the Presbyterian Church (USA), the youngest in history 
 Tina Kotek, Class of 1984 or 1985, Speaker of the Oregon House of Representatives and Governor of Oregon as of January 2023. 
 Scott Wagner, Class of 1974, politician, former owner of York Waste Disposal and Penn Waste, current owner of KBS Trucking.
[Owen Terosso} Artist and music producer

References

Public high schools in Pennsylvania
Educational institutions established in 1929
Schools in York County, Pennsylvania
1929 establishments in Pennsylvania